Hubert Robaszek (born 25 April 1981 in Piotrków Trybunalski) is a Polish footballer.

Career
In the winter 2010, he joined Dolcan Ząbki.

References

External links
 

1981 births
Living people
Sportspeople from Piotrków Trybunalski
Polish footballers
Association football midfielders
Widzew Łódź players
Promień Żary players
KSZO Ostrowiec Świętokrzyski players
Polonia Bytom players
Ząbkovia Ząbki players